John "Jack" Russell (21 December 1795 – 28 April 1883), known as "The Sporting Parson", vicar of Swimbridge and rector of Black Torrington in North Devon, was an enthusiastic fox-hunter and dog breeder, who developed the Jack Russell Terrier and the Parson Russell Terrier,  both of which are a variety of the Fox Terrier breed.

Origins
Russell was born on 21 December 1795 in Dartmouth, South Devon, the eldest son of John Russell by his wife Nora Jewell. He lived at Sandhill House.

Education
He was educated at Plympton Grammar School, Blundell's School, Tiverton and Exeter College, Oxford.

Sporting career
It was at Exeter College, legend has it, that he spotted a little white terrier with dark tan spots over her eyes, ears and at the tip of her tail, who was owned by a local milkman in the nearby small hamlet of Elsfield or Marston). Russell bought the dog on the spot and this animal, called "Trump", became the foundation of a line of fox hunting terriers that became known as Jack Russell Terriers. They were well-suited by the shortness and strength of their legs for digging out foxes which had "gone to earth" having been hunted over-ground by fox hounds.

Russell was a founding member of The Kennel Club. He helped to write the breed standard for the Fox Terrier (Smooth) and became a respected judge.  He did not show his own fox terriers on the conformation bench, saying that the difference between his dogs and the conformation dogs could be likened to the difference between wild and cultivated flowers.

Clerical career
Russell was appointed vicar of Swimbridge in North Devon, where the local public house was renamed the "Jack Russell Inn" and still stands today. He was also rector of Black Torrington in Devon. At Swimbridge Russell enjoyed a hectic social life, with formal dining, charity fundraising, and an active career as a Freemason.

Marriage
In 1836 at Swimbridge he married Penelope Incledon-Bury, third daughter and co-heiress of Vice-Admiral Richard Incledon-Bury (1757-1825), Royal Navy, lord of the manor of Colleton, Chulmleigh in Devon, who resided at Dennington, Swimbridge. Russell is said to have had expensive sporting habits both on and off the hunting-field, which drained the substantial resources of his heiress wife and left the estate of Colleton in poor condition.

Death and burial
Russell died on 28 April 1883 and was buried in the churchyard of St. James's Church, Swimbridge, where he was vicar.

See also
Jack Russell Terrier
Parson Russell Terrier
Russell Terrier

References

Further reading
Parson Jack Russell: The Hunting Legend 1795-1883 by Charles Noon, Halsgrove Publishers.

Baker, Margaret Mitford. Jack Russell, hunting parson of old Devon. Devon Life vol. 7 no. 56 (1971) pp. 37. [1796-1833]
Davies, E.W.L. A memoir of the Rev. John Russell and his out-of-door life. (New ed.) London: Richard Bentley & Son, (1883), portrait, xii, 397 pp. [Index]
Kerr, Eleanor. Hunting parson: the life and times of the Reverend John Russell. London: Herbert Jenkins (1963) 192p, plates: ill.
Lamplugh, Lois. Parson Jack Russell of Swimbridge. Swimbridge: Wellspring (1994) [ii], 27p: ill, ports []
Noon, C. Parson Jack Russell: The Hunting Legend 1995–1883, Halsgrove Press, Tiverton (2000) 144 pp. []
Pepper, Frank S. Parson Jack Russell. Swimbridge: Church Council (1981) 8p. [Westcountry Studies Library - p920/RUS]
Lifetime Passion for All Forms of Hunting: The Sporting Parson The Reverend John Russell. Devon Family Historian 84 (1997) pp. 2–3. [The Hunting Parson who bred the Jack Russell terrier]

Dog breeders
People from Dartmouth, Devon
1795 births
1883 deaths
Masters of foxhounds in England
People educated at Blundell's School
Alumni of Exeter College, Oxford